Collepino is a village in Umbria, central Italy. It is a frazione of the comune of Spello.

Geography
Collepino is situated on a hill 600m.a.s. at the flank of  Monte Subasio on a panoramic road from Spello to Assisi

History
Collepino can be traced back to the 13th century. The inhabitants were shepherds and woodworkers at the nearby Abbey S. Silvestro.

Historic sites
 Castello di Collepino
 San Silvestro Abbey (founded in 1025 a.c.), in Romantic style 
 Fonte di S. Silvestro near the abbey
 Chiesa della Madonna della Spella on the hilltop of Monte Subasio

Notes and references

External links 

Frazioni of the Province of Perugia
Hilltowns in Umbria